Ben Sammut (born 13 February 1975) is a former professional rugby league footballer who played primarily as a  in the 1990s and 2000s.

References

1975 births
Living people
Cronulla-Sutherland Sharks players
Hull F.C. players
Malta national rugby league team captains
Malta national rugby league team players
Newcastle Thunder players
Rugby league fullbacks